Apiognomonia veneta is a plant pathogen which causes anthracnose on London Plane trees.

References

External links 
 USDA ARS Fungal Database

Fungal tree pathogens and diseases
Gnomoniaceae
Fungi described in 1920